Sparisoma rubripinne, which also goes by the common names yellowtail parrotfish or redfin parrotfish is a species of parrotfish in the genus Sparisoma. It can be found in the Western Atlantic Ocean, and is primarily found in the Caribbean Sea.

Description 
Sparisoma rubripinne is a medium-sized parrotfish that grows to a maximum length of 47.8 cm. Juveniles and initial-phased adults are a drab silver-tan with a barred pattern on the scales. Additionally, juveniles and initial-phased adults have a bright yellow caudal peduncle and caudal fin. In contrast, terminal phase males are a dull blueish-green with a large black spot on the pectoral fin base.

Biology 
Sparisoma rubripinne inhabits coral reefs and seagrass meadows in the Western Atlantic Ocean. Here, it can be found from depths of 1–15 meters deep.

References 

rubripinne
Fish described in 1840